Rory Warlow (13 April 1990) is an English sport shooter born in Plymouth. At the 2012 Summer Olympics he competed in the Men's skeet, finishing in 16th place.

At the 2014 Commonwealth Games, he won the bronze medal in the men's skeet, beating Cyprus's Andreas Chasikos to claim the medal.

References

1990 births
Living people
English male sport shooters
Sportspeople from Plymouth, Devon
Olympic shooters of Great Britain
Shooters at the 2012 Summer Olympics
Commonwealth Games bronze medallists for England
Shooters at the 2014 Commonwealth Games
Commonwealth Games medallists in shooting
Medallists at the 2014 Commonwealth Games